Matudaea trinervia is a species of plant in the family Hamamelidaceae. It is endemic to Mexico.

References

Flora of Mexico
Hamamelidaceae
Vulnerable plants
Taxonomy articles created by Polbot